St. Athanasius' Church or variations may refer to:

Albania
St. Athanasius' Monastery Church, Leshnicë e Poshtme
St. Athanasius' Church, Moscopole
St. Athanasius' Monastery Church, Erind

Bulgaria
Church of St Athanasius, Boboshevo
Monastery of Saint Athanasius, Chirpan

Greece
Church of St Athanasius of Mouzaki, Kastoria
Church of St Athanasius, Thessaloniki

Italy
Sant'Atanasio, Rome
Sant'Atanasio a Via Tiburtina, Rome

United States
St. Athanasius Episcopal Church and Parish House and the Church of the Holy Comforter, Burlington, North Carolina
St. Athanasius Church (Bronx)